Puerto Inca is a town in Central Peru, capital of the province Puerto Inca in the region Huánuco.

Populated places in the Huánuco Region